Operation Bishop was the Argentine addition to the coalition forces from 35 nations led by the United States in the Gulf War against Iraq in response to Iraq's invasion and annexation of Kuwait. The operation was composed of four warships and two helicopters.

The Operation resulted in Argentina gaining the designation as a major non-NATO ally by President Bill Clinton in 1998.

See also
 Sea Fleet Command (Argentina)

References

Wars involving Argentina